Colfax Township is a township in Wilson County, Kansas, in the United States.

History
Colfax Township was established in 1870. It was named for Schuyler Colfax.

References

Townships in Wilson County, Kansas
Townships in Kansas